Save a Child's Heart (SACH) is an Israeli humanitarian organisation providing cardiac healthcare to children worldwide. SACH was founded in 1995 and is based at the Edith Wolfson Medical Center near Tel Aviv, Israel.

Impact
SACH provides life-saving cardiac surgical and catheterization procedures for children from low-and-middle-income countries at the Save a Child's Heart International Pediatric Cardiac Center (SACH IPCC) at the new Sylvan Adams Children's Hospital in the Wolfson Medical Center in Holon, Israel, near Tel Aviv;
 Operating an in-depth outreach post-graduate fellowship training program for medical personnel from these developing countries in Israel. They have trained doctors from Ethiopia, Tanzania, and the Palestinian Authority to provide comprehensive pediatric cardiologists;
 Sending staff overseas to provide this education and mentorship to local medical professionals, as well as to perform surgeries side-by-side with them. They have sent numerous medical missions every year to many countries including Tanzania, Ethiopia, Zanzibar, and Romania.

As of November 2021, SACH has brought more than 4,500 children to Israel from 63 countries including Ethiopia, Gambia, Vietnam, Jordan, Moldova, Tanzania, Russia, the Philippines, Nigeria, Ghana, Kenya, Angola Iraq, Haiti, Saint Vincent and the Grenadines, Trinidad, Ecuador, Mauritania, Senegal, Côte d'Ivoire, Sierra Leone, Uganda, Democratic Republic of the Congo, Zimbabwe, Zambia, Rwanda, Somalia, Eritrea, Sri Lanka, China, Kazakhstan, Romania, Ukraine, and Syria, as well as from Gaza and the West Bank (the Palestinian Territories). Approximately 50% of the children are from the Palestinian Authority, Jordan, Iraq and Morocco, more than 30% are from Africa, and the remainder are from Asia, Eastern Europe, and the Americas. In December 2010 the first child from Indonesia was brought to Israel by SACH and underwent successful surgery in January 2011.

SACH's doctors and medical personnel volunteer their time and expertise, with the only costs (about $10,000 US) used to provide post-surgical care at SACH's Children's Home in Israel for an average stay of about three months. Children are brought to Israel from their home country in groups of four to six, accompanied by a nurse or, if they are under age three, by a family member.

Save a Child's Heart Foundation U.S. has been certified by Independent Charities of America as one of about 2,000 “Best in America” charities, verification that its “fund-raising materials and other information to the public is truthful and non-deceptive” and that it provides “documented provision of substantive services.” Save a Child's Heart Foundation U.S. has received the Independent Charities Seal of Excellence, awarded to the members of Independent Charities of America and Local Independent Charities of America that have, upon rigorous independent review, been able to certify, document, and demonstrate, on an annual basis, that they meet the highest standards of public accountability, program effectiveness, and cost effectiveness. These standards include those required by the U.S. Government for inclusion in the Combined Federal Campaign. Of the 1,000,000 charities operating in the United States today, it is estimated that fewer than 50,000, or 5 percent, meet or exceed these standards, and, of those, fewer than 2,000 have been awarded this Seal."

SACH is the first and only Israeli organization to receive the prestigious United Nations Population Award for outstanding achievements in population and health providing free lifesaving heart treatments to children in need all over the world in 2018.

Surgeries performed in Israel

Save a Child's Heart has treated over 6,000 children from 63 low-and-middle-income countries at the Wolfson Medical Center.

In 2013, amidst the Syrian Civil War, SACH conducted an open-heart surgery on a 5-year old Syrian girl. The pre-schooler, living as a refugee in an undisclosed country, traveled to the Wolfson Medical Hospital in Holon to receive the treatment. She was the first Syrian child to receive the free medical care and surgery.

International activities

China – On November 16, 2008, a SACH training and surgical mission left for Shijiazhuang in the Hebei Province in China. This was SACH's 8th mission to China where its medical teams have saved, with Chinese colleagues, more than 100 Chinese children.

Angola - On May 3, 2009, a SACH medical team left for Luanda, Angola, to examine and screen Angolan children. The team examined 88 children. Among them were children who had been treated in Israel and needed a follow up examination.

Moldova – On November 11, 2007, a SACH team arrived in Kishinev, Moldova, to work with a team of local pediatric cardiologists. The mixed surgical group examined children and performed surgeries for five days.

Tanzania – In August 2011, a SACH team of Doctors, Nurses, Staff and Volunteers traveled to Tanzania to the Bugando Medical Center to work alongside local partners. During this Mission SACH, together with the local partners screened 300 children and performed 12 surgeries on Ethiopian children. A week later, a team of SACH volunteers, doctors and staff climbed Mount Kilimanjaro in an effort to raise $1M to save the lives of African children in need. As of January 2018 there have been 7 medical missions to Tanzania.

Romania - In 2017 there were two missions to Romania in March and November. During these missions, Israeli doctors traveled to help assist Romanian medical staff in performing over 11 life saving heart procedures as well as performing their own procedures.

Zanzibar - There have been approximately 10 medical missions to Zanzibar since 2008, the most recent being in 2020. Save a Child's Heart (SACH) sent an all-women's mission to Zanzibar in mid-February 2017 to screen and diagnose children in need of life-saving heart procedures. SACH worked with its medical partners at the Mnazi Mmoia Hospital in Zanzibar to conduct screenings and determine which children are in need of heart surgeries. Throughout the mission, there were a total of 270 children in Zanzibar screened.

SACH Photo Exhibit Tours the Globe

Since 2008, a photo exhibit of SACH activities has been presented in cities around the world, including Abuja (Nigeria), Brussels, Detroit, Glasgow, Hebei (China), Jerusalem, Johannesburg, Melbourne, Miami, Moscow, Philadelphia, Quezon City (Philippines), Singapore, Sydney, Toronto, Vancouver and Washington, DC.

References

External links
Save a Child's Heart - website
Idan Raichel's report of a trip with SACH
Israeli Doctors Treat Iraqi Patients

Children's charities based in Israel
Medical and health organizations based in Israel
Pediatric organizations